Entrelacs is a commune in the Savoie department of southeastern France. The municipality was established on 1 January 2016 and consists of the former communes of Albens, Cessens, Épersy, Mognard, Saint-Germain-la-Chambotte and Saint-Girod.

Geography

Climate

Entrelacs has a oceanic climate (Köppen climate classification Cfb).

Population

See also 
Communes of the Savoie department

References 

Communes of Savoie